Beckner is a surname. Notable people with the surname include:

Dick Beckner (1927–1997), American gymnast
Jack Beckner (1930–2016), American artistic gymnast, coach, and referee
Terry Beckner (born 1997), American football player
William Beckner (disambiguation), multiple people

See also
Becker